Yosuke Watanuki was the defending champion and successfully defended his title, defeating Frederico Ferreira Silva 6–7(3–7), 7–5, 6–4 in the final.

Seeds

Draw

Finals

Top half

Bottom half

References

External links
Main draw
Qualifying draw

Kobe Challenger - 1
2022 Singles